The 1993 World Games, the fourth World Games, were an international multi-sport event held in The Hague, Netherlands.

Titles
155 titles were awarded in 23 sports (not including invitational sports — aikido, equestrian vaulting, indoor tug of war, and barefoot waterski).

Medal table

The medal tally during the fourth World Games is as follows. Germany finished at the top of the final medal table. There were two gold medals (and zero silver medals) awarded in five of the acrobatic gymnastics events because of ties for first place. There were two bronze medals awarded in the karate kumite (10) and taekwondo (12) events and one of the acrobatic gymnastics events.

References

External links
 Official Website of the IWGA
 Medal table at Sports123 (by Internet Archive)

 
1993
World Games
International sports competitions hosted by the Netherlands
World Games
Multi-sport events in the Netherlands
Sports competitions in The Hague
20th century in The Hague